Taşköprü, or the Stone Bridge, is a stone three-arch bridge over the Kars River (a tributary of the Aras River) river, northwest of Kars city center and directly south of Kars castle.

The bridge was built in 1579 of ashlar basalt blocks as part of a program of works in Kars by Lala Mustafa Pasha, who became Sultan Murad III's grand vizier the following year. This bridge was subsequently destroyed by a flood, and it was rebuilt in 1719 (some records say 1725) by Karahanoğlu Haci Ebubekir Bey. It was restored by the 18th Region of the Highways Directorate in 2013.

References

Sources

Deck arch bridges
Ottoman bridges in Turkey
Buildings and structures in Kars Province
Stone bridges in Turkey
Tourist attractions in Kars Province
Arch bridges in Turkey